Samir El Gaaouiri (born 28 May 1984) is a Dutch former professional footballer and current football agent. He played as a winger.

Career 
El Gaaouiri began his professional career in 2001 at Fortuna Sittard. The first season he played very few games, but in the next couple of seasons he made 48 appearances, in which he scored 5 goals. He signed with Utrecht in 2004. He would, however, only play 8 matches and therefore signed a one-season loan deal with Volendam, where he made 38 appearances during the season and scored 11 goals. His role as a reserve continued at Utrecht, and as a result he was sent on loan to HFC Haarlem. There, he played 28 matches and scored only 3 goals. In 2007, he moved permanently to VVV-Venlo, where he was part of the team reaching promotion to the Eredivisie in the 2008–09 season. Personally, he experienced a strong season too, scoring 12 goals and providing 13 assists.

On 27 June 2009, El Gaaouiri signed a two-year contract with Belgian club Roeselare. After the dismissal of head coach Dennis van Wijk and the club's relegation to the Belgian Second Division, the contract of El Gaaouiri with Roeselare was dissolved in July 2010.

In February 2011, he started playing for AGOVV Apeldoorn. He left that club in the summer. In January 2012, he began playing for Police United. He retired from football in December 2012 without making an appearance for the club, after it was discovered that he had a heart condition.

After his retirement, El Gaaouri has worked as a players agent, representing Edson Braafheid among others.

Honours
VVV-Venlo
Eerste Divisie: 2008–09

References

External links
El Gaaouiri profile on VI.nl

1984 births
Living people
Dutch footballers
Footballers from Limburg (Netherlands)
Dutch expatriate footballers
Dutch sportspeople of Moroccan descent
Sportspeople from Weert
Fortuna Sittard players
FC Utrecht players
FC Volendam players
HFC Haarlem players
VVV-Venlo players
K.S.V. Roeselare players
AGOVV Apeldoorn players
Samir El Gaaouiri
Eerste Divisie players
Eredivisie players
Belgian Pro League players
Expatriate footballers in Belgium
Expatriate footballers in Thailand
Dutch expatriate sportspeople in Belgium
Dutch expatriate sportspeople in Thailand
Association football wingers
Association football agents